The 1967–68 Philadelphia Flyers season was the Philadelphia Flyers' inaugural season and the first National Hockey League (NHL) season in Philadelphia, Pennsylvania, since the Philadelphia Quakers' 1930–31 season. The Flyers won the West Division, but lost in the first round of the playoffs to the St. Louis Blues in seven games.

NHL expansion

Philadelphia waited almost 35 years from when the Quakers' played their last home game (a 4–0 loss to Chicago on March 17, 1931) for the NHL to return when the city was awarded an expansion franchise on February 9, 1966. Philadelphia was a bit of a surprise choice since a group from the nearby city of Baltimore were considered favorites to land a team.

The man who often receives the most credit for bringing NHL hockey back to Philadelphia is Ed Snider. While attending a basketball game in 1964 at the Boston Garden, the then vice-president of the Philadelphia Eagles observed a crowd of Boston Bruins fans lining up to purchase tickets to see a last-place team. Intrigued, he began making plans for a new arena upon hearing the NHL was looking to expand due to fears of a competing league taking hold on the West Coast and the desire for a new television contract in the United States. Snider made his proposal to the league and the Philadelphia group – including Snider, Bill Putnam, Jerome Schiff, and Eagles owner Jerry Wolman – was chosen over the Baltimore group.

On April 4, 1966, Putnam announced there would be a name-the-team contest and that orange, black and white would be the team colors. Wanting what he referred to as "hot" colors, Putnam's choice was influenced by the orange and white of his alma mater, the University of Texas, and the orange and black of Philadelphia's previous NHL team, the Quakers. Also announced on April 4 was the hiring of a Chicago firm to design the team's arena.

Details of the name-the-team contest were released on July 12, 1966. As sponsor of the contest, ballots were available at local Acme Markets grocery stores and included a top prize of a RCA 21" color television, two season tickets for both the second and third prize winners, and a pair of tickets to a game for the next 100 winners. Among the names considered behind the scenes were Quakers, Ramblers, and Liberty Bells. The first two were the names of previous Philadelphia hockey teams and given the connotations of losing (Quakers) and the minor leagues (Ramblers), were passed over. Liberty Bells, though seriously considered, was also the name of a local race track. Bashers, Blizzards, Bruisers, Huskies, Keystones, Knights, Lancers, Raiders, and Sabres were among the other names considered.

It was Ed Snider's sister Phyllis who ended up naming the team when she suggested Flyers on a return trip from a Broadway play. Ed knew immediately it would be the winning name, since it captured the speed of the game and went well phonetically with Philadelphia. On August 3, 1966, the team name was announced. Of the 11,000 ballots received, more than 100 selected Flyers as the team name and were entered into a drawing to select a winner. 9-year-old boy Alec Stockard from Narberth, who had spelled it "Fliers" on his entry, won the drawing and was declared the winner.

With the name and colors already known, Philadelphia advertising firm Mel Richmann Inc. was hired to design a logo and jersey. With Tom Paul as head of the project, artist Sam Ciccone designed both the logo and jerseys with the concept to represent speed. Ciccone's winged P design, four stylized wings attached to a slanted P with an orange dot to represent a puck, was considered the "obvious choice" over his other designs which included a winged skate. Ciccone's jersey design, a stripe down each shoulder and down the arms, represented wings.

Off-season
The men hired to build the expansion Flyers were Bud Poile as general manager and Keith Allen as head coach. Both were former NHL players and were Western Hockey League coaches in the years preceding expansion, Poile with the San Francisco Seals and Allen with the Seattle Totems. On May 8, 1967, the Flyers purchased the American Hockey League's Quebec Aces and with them acquired sixteen professional players and the rights to sixteen amateur players. The NHL Expansion Draft was held a month later on June 6. The six expansion franchises selected 20 players from the Original Six teams, though most of the players available were either aging veterans or career minor-leaguers before expansion occurred. Among the Flyers' 20 selections were Bernie Parent, Doug Favell, Ed Van Impe, Joe Watson, Lou Angotti (who was named the Flyers' first captain), Leon Rochefort, and Gary Dornhoefer. The following day, the Flyers made two selections in the 1967 NHL Amateur Draft, notably Serge Bernier 5th overall from the Sorel Éperviers.

Regular season
The Flyers made their debut on October 11, 1967, losing 5–1 on the road to the California Seals. Bill Sutherland scored the first goal in franchise history. They won their first game a week later, defeating the St. Louis Blues on the road, 2–1. The Flyers made their home debut in front of a crowd of 7,812, shutting out their trans-Pennsylvania rivals, the Pittsburgh Penguins, 1–0 on October 19. With all six expansion teams grouped into the same division, the Flyers were able to win the division with a below .500 record and after being forced to play their last seven home games on the road (five of them at Le Colisée in Quebec City, the home of their AHL affiliate) due to a March 1 storm blowing parts of the Spectrum's roof off.

The team was led offensively by Leon Rochefort in goals (21) and Lou Angotti in assists (37) and points (49). Bill Sutherland was the only other player on the team with at least 20 goals and Gary Dornhoefer was the only other player with at least 30 assists. Rochefort was the only Flyer to take part in the NHL All-Star Game. Despite the lack of offensive firepower, the Flyers were strong enough defensively to be a respectable 8–15–1 against Original Six teams, winning at least one game against all six and winning three of their four games against the defending Stanley Cup champion Toronto Maple Leafs. 22-year-old goaltenders Doug Favell and Bernie Parent split time in net and put up similar numbers. Favell finished 3rd in Calder Memorial Trophy voting.

Season standings

Record vs. opponents

Playoffs
The Flyers returned to the Spectrum in time to open up their first playoff series on April 4, 1968, against the St. Louis Blues. The Blues came into the series as underdogs, but they took Game 1 1–0. Pat Hannigan scored the Flyers first ever playoff goal 1:32 into the first period of Game 2. Tied going into the third period, Leon Rochefort's goal with 13:09 left proved to be the game winner in a 4–3 result. The series shifted to St. Louis and the Flyers lost both Games 3 and 4. With the Flyers on the verge of elimination, Rosaire Paiement scored a hat trick in Game 5 and the Flyers won 6–1. Returning to St. Louis for Game 6, Don Blackburn's goal with 8:42 left in the 2nd overtime forced a Game 7. However, the Flyers lost Game 7 by a score of 3–1.

Schedule and results

Regular season

|- style="background:#fcf;"
| 1 || October 11 || Philadelphia || 1–5 || California || Parent || 6,886 || 0–1–0 || 0 || 
|- style="background:#fcf;"
| 2 || October 14 || Philadelphia || 2–4 || Los Angeles || Favell || 7,035 || 0–2–0 || 0 || 
|- style="background:#cfc;"
| 3 || October 18 || Philadelphia || 2–1 || St. Louis || Favell || 5,234 || 1–2–0 || 2 || 
|- style="background:#cfc;"
| 4 || October 19 || Pittsburgh || 0–1 || Philadelphia || Favell || 7,812 || 2–2–0 || 4 || 
|- style="background:#cfc;"
| 5 || October 22 || California || 2–5 || Philadelphia || Favell || 5,783 || 3–2–0 || 6 || 
|- style="background:#fcf;"
| 6 || October 28 || Detroit || 3–1 || Philadelphia || Favell || 10,859 || 3–3–0 || 6 || 
|- style="background:#ffc;"
| 7 || October 29 || California || 2–2 || Philadelphia || Favell || 4,708 || 3–3–1 || 7 || 
|-

|- style="background:#fcf;"
| 8 || November 2 || Minnesota || 3–1 || Philadelphia || Favell || 4,203 || 3–4–1 || 7 || 
|- style="background:#cfc;"
| 9 || November 4 || Philadelphia || 4–1 || Montreal || Parent || 14,822 || 4–4–1 || 9 || 
|- style="background:#ffc;"
| 10 || November 5 || Montreal || 1–1 || Philadelphia || Parent || 9,188 || 4–4–2 || 10 || 
|- style="background:#ffc;"
| 11 || November 8 || Philadelphia || 1–1 || Pittsburgh || Parent || 4,719 || 4–4–3 || 11 || 
|- style="background:#cfc;"
| 12 || November 12 || Philadelphia || 4–2 || Boston || Parent || 13,909 || 5–4–3 || 13 || 
|- style="background:#fcf;"
| 13 || November 15 || Philadelphia || 0–5 || Pittsburgh || Parent || 6,876 || 5–5–3 || 13 || 
|- style="background:#cfc;"
| 14 || November 16 || New York || 2–3 || Philadelphia || Favell || 11,276 || 6–5–3 || 15 || 
|- style="background:#ffc;"
| 15 || November 18 || Philadelphia || 2–2 || Minnesota || Favell || 10,466 || 6–5–4 || 16 || 
|- style="background:#cfc;"
| 16 || November 19 || St. Louis || 2–3 || Philadelphia || Parent || 7,102 || 7–5–4 || 18 || 
|- style="background:#cfc;"
| 17 || November 22 || Detroit || 2–4 || Philadelphia || Parent || 12,086 || 8–5–4 || 20 || 
|- style="background:#cfc;"
| 18 || November 25 || Philadelphia || 2–1 || St. Louis || Parent || 8,570 || 9–5–4 || 22 || 
|- style="background:#cfc;"
| 19 || November 26 || Los Angeles || 2–7 || Philadelphia || Parent || 11,420 || 10–5–4 || 24 || 
|- style="background:#fcf;"
| 20 || November 29 || Philadelphia || 1–3 || Chicago || Parent || 17,200 || 10–6–4 || 24 || 
|- style="background:#fcf;"
| 21 || November 30 || California || 3–1 || Philadelphia || Parent || 3,167 || 10–7–4 || 24 || 
|-

|- style="background:#cfc;"
| 22 || December 3 || St. Louis || 2–4 || Philadelphia || Parent || 8,727 || 11–7–4 || 26 || 
|- style="background:#fcf;"
| 23 || December 6 || Philadelphia || 2–4 || California || Favell || 2,426 || 11–8–4 || 26 || 
|- style="background:#cfc;"
| 24 || December 8 || Philadelphia || 3–0 || Los Angeles || Favell || 4,624 || 12–8–4 || 28 || 
|- style="background:#fcf;"
| 25 || December 10 || Chicago || 3–0 || Philadelphia || Favell || 14,646 || 12–9–4 || 28 || 
|- style="background:#ffc;"
| 26 || December 14 || St. Louis || 2–2 || Philadelphia || Parent || 8,005 || 12–9–5 || 29 || 
|- style="background:#cfc;"
| 27 || December 16 || Philadelphia || 1–0 || St. Louis || Parent || 7,570 || 13–9–5 || 31 || 
|- style="background:#cfc;"
| 28 || December 17 || Pittsburgh || 1–2 || Philadelphia || Parent || 7,522 || 14–9–5 || 33 || 
|- style="background:#cfc;"
| 29 || December 21 || Minnesota || 0–6 || Philadelphia || Parent || 7,638 || 15–9–5 || 35 || 
|- style="background:#fcf;"
| 30 || December 23 || Philadelphia || 2–3 || Chicago || Parent || 17,500 || 15–10–5 || 35 || 
|- style="background:#fcf;"
| 31 || December 25 || New York || 3–1 || Philadelphia || Parent || 9,456 || 15–11–5 || 35 || 
|- style="background:#fcf;"
| 32 || December 28 || Philadelphia || 3–5 || Detroit || Favell || 13,568 || 15–12–5 || 35 || 
|- style="background:#cfc;"
| 33 || December 30 || Philadelphia || 2–0 || Los Angeles || Favell || 14,000 || 16–12–5 || 37 || 
|- style="background:#cfc;"
| 34 || December 31 || Los Angeles || 1–9 || Philadelphia || Favell || 5,643 || 17–12–5 || 39 || 
|-

|- style="background:#fcf;"
| 35 || January 4 || Boston || 3–2 || Philadelphia || Parent || 10,097 || 17–13–5 || 39 || 
|- style="background:#ffc;"
| 36 || January 6 || Philadelphia || 2–2 || Pittsburgh || Favell || 7,351 || 17–13–6 || 40 || 
|- style="background:#cfc;"
| 37 || January 7 || Pittsburgh || 1–3 || Philadelphia || Favell || 7,935 || 18–13–6 || 42 || 
|- style="background:#fcf;"
| 38 || January 10 || Philadelphia || 4–6 || Minnesota || Favell || 9,768 || 18–14–6 || 42 || 
|- style="background:#fcf;"
| 39 || January 11 || Montreal || 4–2 || Philadelphia || Parent || 14,126 || 18–15–6 || 42 || 
|- style="background:#cfc;"
| 40 || January 14 || Philadelphia || 6–3 || Oakland || Parent || 2,878 || 19–15–6 || 44 || 
|- style="background:#cfc;"
| 41 || January 18 || Philadelphia || 4–2 || Minnesota || Favell || 9,098 || 20–15–6 || 46 || 
|- style="background:#fcf;"
| 42 || January 20 || Philadelphia || 2–4 || Boston || Parent || 13,527 || 20–16–6 || 46 || 
|- style="background:#ffc;"
| 43 || January 21 || St. Louis || 2–2 || Philadelphia || Parent || 10,834 || 20–16–7 || 47 || 
|- style="background:#cfc;"
| 44 || January 24 || Philadelphia || 2–1 || Toronto || Favell || 15,834 || 21–16–7 || 49 || 
|- style="background:#fcf;"
| 45 || January 25 || Minnesota || 3–0 || Philadelphia || Parent || 9,334 || 21–17–7 || 49 || 
|- style="background:#fcf;"
| 46 || January 27 || Philadelphia || 2–3 || Detroit || Parent || 12,820 || 21–18–7 || 49 || 
|- style="background:#fcf;"
| 47 || January 28 || Los Angeles || 2–0 || Philadelphia || Favell || 13,577 || 21–19–7 || 49 || 
|-
| colspan="10" style="text-align:center;"|
Notes:
The California Seals changed their name to the Oakland Seals on December 8, 1967.
|-

|- style="background:#ffc;"
| 48 || February 1 || Oakland || 3–3 || Philadelphia || Favell || 6,386 || 21–19–8 || 50 || 
|- style="background:#cfc;"
| 49 || February 3 || Chicago || 3–5 || Philadelphia || Parent || 14,646 || 22–19–8 || 52 || 
|- style="background:#cfc;"
| 50 || February 4 || Toronto || 1–4 || Philadelphia || Favell || 14,646 || 23–19–8 || 54 || 
|- style="background:#fcf;"
| 51 || February 7 || Philadelphia || 1–4 || Montreal || Parent || 14,026 || 23–20–8 || 54 || 
|- style="background:#cfc;"
| 52 || February 10 || Philadelphia || 2–1 || St. Louis || Favell || 13,112 || 24–20–8 || 56 || 
|- style="background:#cfc;"
| 53 || February 11 || Philadelphia || 3–2 || Minnesota || Favell || 15,154 || 25–20–8 || 58 || 
|- style="background:#fcf;"
| 54 || February 14 || Philadelphia || 0–4 || Oakland || Parent || 3,069 || 25–21–8 || 58 || 
|- style="background:#fcf;"
| 55 || February 16 || Philadelphia || 1–7 || Los Angeles || Parent || 9,867 || 25–22–8 || 58 || 
|- style="background:#fcf;"
| 56 || February 18 || Philadelphia || 1–3 || New York || Favell || 17,250 || 25–23–8 || 58 || 
|- style="background:#ffc;"
| 57 || February 21 || Philadelphia || 1–1 || Pittsburgh || Favell || 9,198 || 25–23–9 || 59 || 
|- style="background:#cfc;"
| 58 || February 22 || Minnesota || 3–7 || Philadelphia || Favell || 14,392 || 26–23–9 || 61 || 
|- style="background:#fcf;"
| 59 || February 25 || Pittsburgh || 2–1 || Philadelphia || Favell || 14,418 || 26–24–9 || 61 || 
|- style="background:#fcf;"
| 60 || February 29 || Los Angeles || 3–1 || Philadelphia || Favell || 9,115 || 26–25–9 || 61 || 
|-

|- style="background:#fcf;"
| 61 || March 2 || Philadelphia || 0–4 || New York || Parent || 17,235 || 26–26–9 || 61 || 
|- style="background:#ffc;"
| 62 || March 3 || Oakland || 1–1 || Philadelphia || Favell || 12,127 || 26–26–10 || 62 || 
|- style="background:#fcf;"
| 63 || March 6 || Philadelphia || 2–7 || Toronto || Favell || 15,831 || 26–27–10 || 62 || 
|- style="background:#fcf;"
| 64 || March 7 || Boston || 2–1 || Philadelphia || Parent || 10,452 || 26–28–10 || 62 || 
|- style="background:#cfc;"
| 65 || March 10 || Minnesota || 0–2 || Philadelphia || Parent || 10,171 || 27–28–10 || 64 || 
|- style="background:#cfc;"
| 66 || March 13 || Philadelphia || 4–2 || Minnesota || Favell || 13,387 || 28–28–10 || 66 || 
|- style="background:#ffc;"
| 67 || March 14 || Los Angeles || 0–0 || Philadelphia || Parent || 4,116 || 28–28–11 || 67 || 
|- style="background:#cfc;"
| 68 || March 17 || Toronto || 4–7 || Philadelphia || Parent || 13,650 || 29–28–11 || 69 || 
|- style="background:#cfc;"
| 69 || March 20 || Philadelphia || 5–1 || Oakland || Parent || 3,918 || 30–28–11 || 71 || 
|- style="background:#fcf;"
| 70 || March 23 || Philadelphia || 2–4 || Los Angeles || Parent || 14,003 || 30–29–11 || 71 || 
|- style="background:#fcf;"
| 71 || March 27 || Philadelphia || 0–3 || St. Louis || Favell || 9,315 || 30–30–11 || 71 || 
|- style="background:#cfc;"
| 72 || March 28 || St. Louis || 0–2 || Philadelphia || Favell || 5,382 || 31–30–11 || 73 || 
|- style="background:#fcf;"
| 73 || March 30 || Pittsburgh || 2–0 || Philadelphia || Favell || 5,569 || 31–31–11 || 73 || 
|- style="background:#fcf;"
| 74 || March 31 || Philadelphia || 1–5 || Pittsburgh || Favell || 6,756 || 31–32–11 || 73 || 
|-
| colspan="10" style="text-align:center;"|
Notes:
Game played at Madison Square Garden due to the roof blowing off the Spectrum during a March 1 storm.
Game played at Maple Leaf Gardens due to the roof blowing off the Spectrum during a March 1 storm.
Game played at Le Colisée due to the roof blowing off the Spectrum during a March 1 storm.
|-

|-
| Legend:

Playoffs

|- align=center bgcolor="#fcf"
| 1 || April 4 || St. Louis || 1–0 || Philadelphia ||  || Parent || 10,649 || Blues lead 1–0 || 
|- align=center bgcolor="#cfc"
| 2 || April 6 || St. Louis || 3–4 || Philadelphia ||  || Favell || 11,111  || Series tied 1–1 || 
|- align=center bgcolor="#fcf"
| 3 || April 10 || Philadelphia || 2–3 || St. Louis || 2OT || Parent || 10,867 || Blues lead 2–1 || 
|- align=center bgcolor="#fcf"
| 4 || April 11 || Philadelphia || 2–5 || St. Louis ||  || Favell || 11,070 || Blues lead 3–1 || 
|- align=center bgcolor="#cfc"
| 5 || April 13 || St. Louis || 1–6 || Philadelphia || || Parent || 10,587 || Blues lead 3–2 || 
|- align=center bgcolor="#cfc"
| 6 || April 16 || Philadelphia || 2–1 || St. Louis || 2OT || Parent || 13,738 || Series tied 3–3 || 
|- align=center bgcolor="#fcf"
| 7 || April 18 || St. Louis || 3–1 || Philadelphia || || Parent || 14,646 || Blues win 4–3 || 
|-

|-
| Legend:

Player statistics

Scoring
 Position abbreviations: C = Center; D = Defense; G = Goaltender; LW = Left Wing; RW = Right Wing
  = Joined team via a transaction (e.g., trade, waivers, signing) during the season. Stats reflect time with the Flyers only.
  = Left team via a transaction (e.g., trade, waivers, release) during the season. Stats reflect time with the Flyers only.

Goaltending

Awards and records

Awards

Records

Excluding the shortened 1994–95, 2012–13, and 2020–21 seasons, the 173 goals scored during the regular season is the lowest total in franchise history. During game six of the team’s playoff series against St. Louis that the Flyers won 2–1 in the second overtime period, goaltender Bernie Parent made 63 saves on 64 shots against, both team records. His playoff year totals for goals against average (1.36) is also a team record and his save percentage (.963) is a league record.

Milestones

Transactions
The Flyers were involved in the following transactions from May 3, 1967, the day after the deciding game of the 1967 Stanley Cup Finals, through May 11, 1968, the day of the deciding game of the 1968 Stanley Cup Finals.

Trades

Players acquired

Signings

Draft picks

NHL Expansion Draft
Philadelphia's picks at the 1967 NHL Expansion Draft, which was held at the Queen Elizabeth Hotel in Montreal, Quebec, on June 6, 1967.

NHL Amateur Draft

Philadelphia's picks at the 1967 NHL Amateur Draft, which was held at the Queen Elizabeth Hotel in Montreal, Quebec, on June 7, 1967.

NHL Special Internal Amateur Draft
Philadelphia's picks at the 1967 NHL Special Internal Amateur Draft, which was held at the Queen Elizabeth Hotel in Montreal, Quebec, on June 7, 1967. Sponsored players aged 20 before May 31, 1967, who played as amateurs during the 1966–67 season were eligible for selection. There were only four selections total in this draft, two of which were made by the Flyers.

Farm teams
The Flyers were affiliated with the Quebec Aces of the AHL, whom they purchased on May 8, 1967, the Seattle Totems and Phoenix Roadrunners of the WHL, and the Knoxville Knights of the EHL. Quebec finished second in their division and made it to the Calder Cup Finals before losing to the Rochester Americans in six games. Head coach Vic Stasiuk was awarded the Louis A. R. Pieri Memorial Award as coach of the year and Simon Nolet won the John B. Sollenberger Trophy as the league's leading scorer. Seattle finished 2nd in the 5-team WHL and won the Lester Patrick Cup as league champions. Knoxville finished 9th in the 12-team EHL and missed the playoffs in what proved to be their final season in existence.

Notes

References
General
 
 
 
Specific

External links
 
 
 

Philadelphia
Philadelphia
Philadelphia Flyers seasons
Philad
Philad